Lipovce is a village and municipality in Prešov District in the Prešov Region of eastern Slovakia.

History
The village was first mentioned in 1320

Geography
The municipality lies at an altitude of 587 metres and covers an area of 22.377 km2. It has a population of about 495 people.

References

External links
 
 
https://web.archive.org/web/20080111223415/http://www.statistics.sk/mosmis/eng/run.html

Villages and municipalities in Prešov District
Šariš